Abarghan (also Romanized as Abarghān) is a village in Abarghan Rural District, in the Central District of Sarab County, East Azerbaijan Province, Iran. At the 2006 census, its population was 1,301, in 315 families.

References 

The name of the word Abarghan in the book (History and Geography of Sarab: Written by Aziz "Mansour" Ebadi Fard Abarghani) has the following meaning;

Populated places in Sarab County